En Sakhiye is a 2000 Tamil-language romantic thriller film directed by the duo Ravi-Raja. The film stars newcomers Devaraj, Divya and Prabhu Sekhar, with K. Rajan, Meenal and Shanmugasundaram playing supporting roles. The film, produced by K. Bhaskar Raj, was released on 1 December 2000.

Plot

Sakhi (Divya), a gold medallist at her college, is an orphan and she completed her college degree thanks to the scholarship programme. After the graduation ceremony, she breaks down in tears as she has no one to turn to and nowhere to go. Her friend Rama (Meenal) then accommodates her at her home.

Later, Sakhi finds a job in a company. The company manager Shanmugam (Shanmugasundaram) warns her about the managing director Raja (Prabhu Sekhar) who spends his days drinking and hanging around with his friends at the beach. Sharma (K. Rajan), the company owner and father of Raja, is busy working overseas and hates his son's behaviour. Sakhi relentlessly pursues the drunkard Raja, makes him fall in love with her. Thereafter, Sakhi makes him change his bad habits and Raja is now ready to wed her. But just before the wedding, Sakhi kills him.

She now turns her attention to Sunil (Devaraj), Raja's younger brother, who comes to his brother's funeral from abroad. In contrast to his brother, Sunil is a responsible and smart person. He also falls in love with Sakhi. One of Raja's friend and Shanmugam know that Raja was killed by Sakhi before they disclose the truth Sakhi murders them. Sunil starts to wonder about his brother's death. What transpires next forms the rest of the story.

Cast

Devaraj as Sunil
Divya as Sakhi
Prabhu Sekhar as Raja
K. Rajan as Sharma
Meenal as Rama
Shanmugasundaram as Shanmugam
Karikalan
Suryakanth
Srilekha Rajendran as Rama's mother
Kanishka
Hema as Parvathy
Seema
Rakhi Sawant as an item number
Ganesh Acharya in a special appearance
Arasakumar B. T. in a cameo appearance

Soundtrack

The film score and the soundtrack were composed by Pradeep Ravi. The soundtrack, released in 2000, features 5 tracks with lyrics written by Kamakodiyan and Bharathan.

Release
A reviewer of the film noted "some clichéd, loosely etched, hastily put scenes here. If one has seen Baazigar, one would find most of the scenes in the film familiar. But considering that the actors and the technicians are debutants, they have done a fairly creditable job."

References

2000 films
2000s Tamil-language films
2000s romantic thriller films
Indian romantic thriller films
Indian films about revenge